Type 984 was a Royal Navy radar system introduced in the mid-1950s, designed by the Admiralty Signals and Radar Establishment. Type 984 was a 3D S band system used for both ground controlled interception (GCI) and as a secondary early warning system. It was the most sophisticated naval radar of its era.

Description 
The Type 984 was different from most radars in a number of ways. For one, it used a lens made of metal tubes in place of the more traditional parabolic reflector, which made it look a circular plate rather than the open framework typical of the era. It was mounted on a fully stabilized platform, allowing it to produce a steady image in all but the highest sea states. It also used a unique system for vertical scanning, feeding the output of four cavity magnetrons into four moving feedhorns, each scanning about 5 degrees vertically. Other 3D radars of the era generally picked one solution or the other, using a network of separate feedhorns or a single vertically scanning feed.

A key part of the overall Type 984 installation was the Comprehensive Display System (CDS), an electromechanical computer that developed "tracks" for aircraft in a semi-automated fashion. This greatly reduced operator workload, allowing the overall system to track many dozens of formations of aircraft while continuing to scan for new contacts, what would today be known as track while scan (TWS). In several tests against US Navy aircraft during military exercises, the combination of the 984's high scanning rates and the CDS' tracking made the ships impossible to approach without being intercepted. CDS also allowed the 984 to be used both for interception control, as well as day-to-day air traffic control around the fleet aircraft carriers.

Many Navy designs of the early 1950s intended to mount the 984, and some sported two installations, fore and aft. As the design matured its weight continued to grow, ultimately reaching , making it too heavy for most ships. At the same time, the Navy's inventory of large ships was shrinking.

References

External links

 
 

Naval radars
Cold War military equipment of the United Kingdom
Royal Navy Radar
Military equipment introduced in the 1950s